Ashish Bhasin is a globally recognised media veteran. He has been part of the media, advertising & marketing community–representing India and the Asia Pacific market–for the past 34 years. One of the finest thought leaders from this industry, Ashish Bhasin’s powerful opinions frequently find voice amongst the most dominant print and television platforms in the market/s such as The Economic Times, Brand Equity, The Drum and Campaign Asia, to name a few. He represented India as a member of the jury at the 63rd Cannes Lions International Festival of Creativity. Ashish has also served as India's cultural Ambassador to Pennsylvania, USA in 1992 under an exclusive Rotary programme. Ashish retired from his position as CEO APAC and Chairman India, Dentsu in November 2021. In June 2022, he joined the global advertising & marketing transformation startup RD&X Network as its co-founder and chairman.

Early career
Ashish served as Managing Director of Lintas Initiative Outdoor Advertising Private Limited (also known as Aaren Initiative Outdoor Advertising Private Limited). He was the President and Director of Integrated Marketing Action Group at SSC&B Lintas Private Limited, as well as the Asia Regional Director for Integral Marketing at Lowe & Partners Worldwide Limited. At Lintas IMAG, he oversaw eight specialised companies–Linterland for rural marketing, Lintas Personal for CRM and direct marketing, LINOpinion for public relations, Advent for events, Lintertainment for entertainment marketing, Lintas Healthcare for healthcare marketing, dCell for strategic design, and Aaren Initiative for out-of-home. His stints include handling the Hindustan Unilever account in seven Asian countries, managing operations in various Lintas India offices, and running the show as President at Initiative Media.

Career with dentsu international

Bhasin began his career with Dentsu in June 2008. In 2012, Dentsu International (previously known as Dentsu Aegis Network) was formed after the Japanese advertising giant, Dentsu bought over the UK based Aegis group for a reported $5 billion, as reported by The Wall Street Journal. By June 2015, Dentsu international merged its India operations under him. He built Dentsu International in India from a 50 member team to a 3000 member powerhouse, now the 2nd largest Advertising and Marketing Communications Group in India, overturning for the first time the existing ranking, which had historically been in place for over 80 years. He led the acquisition of multiple brands under the Dentsu umbrella, including a battery of digital outfits such as WATConsult, Sokrati and SVG Media. In March 2019, Ashish was named the CEO of Dentsu’s rezoned Greater South (Asia) regions which include India, Sri Lanka, Bangladesh, Indonesia, Thailand, Vietnam, Philippines, Malaysia and Myanmar. Later in the year, he was promoted to CEO APAC Dentsu and became the First Indian Ever to Head Dentsu’s entire APAC business.

Association 
Ashish serves or has served on most industry bodies in India, including as Immediate Past President AAAI, Immediate Past Chairman MRUC, Chairman Goafest 2017 & 2018, Co-Chairman AAAI – IBF committee 2010 - 2018, Board Member-Broadcast Audience Research Council (BARC), Board Member – Audit Bureau of Circulation (ABC), Chairman Media Abbys 2012 & 2013, Chairman - Readership Studies Council of India and Founding Chairman of the Sydenham Institute of Management’s Alumni Association.

Awards and recognition 
Ashish has won a record of four coveted South Asia Agency Head of the Year Award at Campaign Asia-Pacific's Agency of the Year Awards 2015, 2016, 2017 and 2019. He was named Network Head of the Year - Media Ace Awards 2019, a distinction he also was conferred in 2018. He has also been titled the GameChanger 2019 by medianews4u. He was selected as MXM’s Media Person of the Year- 2016. He has been awarded the 2015 IAA Leadership Award for Media Agency Head of the Year and was the exchange4media - Hallmark Chairman of the Year 2015. He is also the recipient of the Business Excellence Awards for a Media CEO of the Year - India & Chairman of the Year – India 2013, 2014 and 2015, at UK’s Business Excellence Awards. He has received the Indira Super Achiever Award 2003 and was also adjudged “Media Marketer of the Year” at the Brief Media Awards and was the Dentsu Aegis Network Star Performer of the Year 2017. Ashish has recently been conferred a PhD (Honoris Causa) by Jharkhand Rai University, for an outstanding contribution to the Advertising & Media Industry.https://www.jru.edu.in/special-convocation/profiles-of-honorary-doctorate-awardees-dec-2019/

References

https://economictimes.indiatimes.com/industry/services/advertising/dentsu-aegis-consolidates-india-business-under-ashish-bhasin/articleshow/47521889.cms
https://www.livemint.com/companies/yrpagdgkwa1eqz5qos88jp/dentsu-aegis-acquires-pr-firm-perfect-relations.html%20saumya%20tewari
https://www.business-standard.com/article/companies/dentsu-aegis-network-acquires-majority-stake-watconsult-115013000588_1.html
https://economictimes.indiatimes.com/how-dentsu-aegis-network-went-on-to-become-the-no-2-advertising-network-in-india/articleshow/57391034.cms

External links

Living people
Indian advertising executives
Year of birth missing (living people)